Korman is a village in Pivara municipality in Kragujevac city district in the Šumadija District of central Serbia. It is located east of the city.
It has a population of 692.

External links
Satellite map at Maplandia.com

Populated places in Šumadija District
Kragujevac